The 2017–18 Biathlon World Cup (BWC) was a multi-race series over a season of biathlon, organised by the International Biathlon Union. The season started on 24 November 2017 in Östersund, Sweden and ended on 25 March 2018 in Tyumen, Russia. The defending overall champions from the 2016–17 Biathlon World Cup were Martin Fourcade of France and Laura Dahlmeier of Germany.

Calendar
Below is the IBU World Cup calendar for the 2017–18 season.

World Cup podiums

Men

Women

Men's team

Women's team

Mixed

Standings: Men

Overall 

Final standings after 22 races.

Individual 

Final standings after 2 races.

Sprint 

Final standings after 8 races.

Pursuit 

Final standings after 7 races.

Mass start 

Final standings after 5 races.

Relay 

Final standings after 4 races.

Nation 

Final standings after 18 races.

Standings: Women

Overall 

Final standings after 22 races.

Individual 

 Final standings after 2 races.

Sprint 

Final standings after 8 races.

Pursuit 

Final standings after 7 races.

Mass start 

Final standings after 5 races.

Relay 

Final standings after 4 races.

Nation 

Final standings after 18 races.

Standings: Mixed

Mixed relay 

Final standings after 4 races.

Medal table

Achievements
First World Cup career victory

Men
 , 31, in his 8th season — Stage 8 Sprint in Oslo Holmenkollen; first podium was 2012–13 Sprint in Sochi
 , 26, in his 6th season — Stage 9 Mass start in Tyumen; first podium was 2015–16 Sprint in Antholz–Anterselva

Women
 , 32, in her 9th season — Stage 1 Individual in Östersund; first podium was 2012–13 Sprint in Pokljuka
 , 28, in her 2nd season — Stage 1 Sprint in Östersund; it was also her first podium
 , 21, in her 4th season — Stage 3 Mass start in Le Grand-Bornand; first podium was 2016–17 Pursuit in Pokljuka
 , 25, in her 6th season — Stage 7 Mass start in Kontiolahti; it was also her first podium

First World Cup podium

Men
 , 26, in his 5th season — no. 3 in the Stage 3 Sprint in Le Grand-Bornand
 , 27, in his 6th season — no. 3 in the Stage 6 Mass start in Anterselva
 , 26, in his 6th season — no. 2 in the Stage 9 Sprint in Tyumen

Women
 , 26, in her 7th season — no. 2 in the Stage 3 Mass start in Le Grand-Bornand
 , 29, in her 9th season — no. 3 in the Stage 5 Individual in Ruhpolding
 , 25, in her 7th season — no. 2 in the Stage 9 Mass start in Tyumen

Victory in this World Cup (all-time number of victories in parentheses)

Men
 , 9 (70) first places
 , 8 (21) first places
 , 1 (11) first place
 , 1 (9) first place
 , 1 (4) first place
 , 1 (1) first place
 , 1 (1) first place

Women
 , 6 (31) first places
 , 5 (11) first places
 , 2 (23) first place
 , 2 (19) first places
 , 2 (2) first places
 , 1 (5) first place
 , 1 (4) first place
 , 1 (1) first place
 , 1 (1) first place
 , 1 (1) first place

Retirements
The following notable biathletes retired during or after the 2017–18 season:

Men
 
 
 
 
 
 
 
 
 
  
 
 
 
 

Women

Notes

References

External links
IBU official site

 
Biathlon World Cup
2017 in biathlon
2018 in biathlon